André Brassard (28 August 1946 – 11 October 2022) was a Canadian stage director, filmmaker and actor, best known for staging the vast majority of Michel Tremblay's plays. He was the director of the French section of the National Arts Center from 1982 to 1989 and the National Theatre School from 1992 to 2000.

Brassard's 1974 film Once Upon a Time in the East was entered into the 1974 Cannes Film Festival. His 1977 film Le soleil se lève en retard was entered into the 10th Moscow International Film Festival. Brassard received a Governor General's Performing Arts Award for his lifetime contributions to Canadian theatre in 2002.

Brassard was openly gay. He died on 11 October 2022, at the age of 76.

Filmography
Françoise Durocher, Waitress - short film, 1972
Once Upon a Time in the East (Il était une fois dans l'est) - 1974
The Late Blossom (Le soleil se lève en retard) - 1977
Frédéric - TV series, 1980
Cap Tourmente - 1993
2 Seconds (2 secondes) - 1998

References

External links

 Article at thecanadianencyclopedia.ca
  Fonds André Brassard (R11897) at Library and Archives Canada

1946 births
2022 deaths
French Quebecers
Canadian screenwriters in French
Canadian male stage actors
Film directors from Montreal
Male actors from Montreal
Writers from Montreal
Canadian theatre directors
National Theatre School of Canada alumni
Prix Denise-Pelletier winners
LGBT film directors
Canadian gay actors
Canadian gay writers
Governor General's Performing Arts Award winners
21st-century Canadian LGBT people
Canadian LGBT screenwriters
Canadian male screenwriters
Gay screenwriters
20th-century Canadian screenwriters